Stacy Lackay (born 26 May 1994) is a South African cricketer. In April 2018, she was named in the South Africa Women's squad for their series against Bangladesh Women. She made her Women's Twenty20 International (WT20I) debut for South Africa against Bangladesh Women on 17 May 2018. She made her Women's One Day International (WODI) debut for South Africa against England Women on 9 June 2018.

References

External links
 
 

1994 births
Living people
Place of birth missing (living people)
South African women cricketers
South Africa women One Day International cricketers
South Africa women Twenty20 International cricketers
Boland women cricketers
Western Province women cricketers
20th-century South African women
21st-century South African women